The following is a list of Guggenheim Fellowships awarded in 1962. Guggenheim Fellowships are American grants that have been awarded annually since 1925 by the John Simon Guggenheim Memorial Foundation to those "who have demonstrated exceptional capacity for productive scholarship or exceptional creative ability in the arts." Each year, the foundation makes several hundred awards in each of two separate competitions: one open to citizens and permanent residents of the United States and Canada and the other to citizens and permanent residents of Latin America and the Caribbean.

1962 U.S. and Canadian Fellows

 Richard S. Allen, writer, Lewiston, Idaho: 1962.
 Ernest Ambler, retired director, National Institute for Standards & Technology: 1962.
 Clarence Willet Asling, Professor Emeritus of Anatomy, School of Medicine, University of California, San Francisco: 1962.
 Karl Thomas Aust, deceased Professor of Metallurgy and Materials Science, University of Toronto: 1962.
 Domingo M. Aviado, president, Atmospheric Health Sciences, Inc.: 1962.
 José Rubia Barcia, deceased Professor Emeritus of Spanish, University of California, Los Angeles: 1962.
 Ford Lewis Battles, deceased Visiting Professor of Church History, Calvin Theological Seminary, Grand Rapids: 1962.
 Henry Ernest Baumgarten, Foundation Professor Emeritus of Chemistry, University of Nebraska-Lincoln: 1962.
 Jerome Beaty, deceased. 19th Century English Literature: 1962.
 Sam Meyer Beiser, deceased. Biology: 1962.
 Robert Bendiner, writer, Huntington, New York: 1962.
 Robert Demo Bent, Emeritus Professor of Physics, Indiana University: 1962.
 Andrew John Berger, deceased. Biology: 1962
 Knight Biggerstaff, Professor Emeritus of Chinese History, Cornell University: 1962.
 Herbert Blau, Distinguished Professor of English and Comparative English, University of Madison-Milwaukee: 1962, 1977.
 Harold Bloom, Sterling Professor of the Humanities, Yale University; Berg Professor of English, New York University: 1962.
 Sol R. Bodner, Emeritus Professor, Markus Reiner Chairman in Mechanics and Rheology, Technion-Israel Institute of Technology: 1962.
 Edgar J. Boell, deceased. Biology and Ecology: 1962.
 Albéric Boivin, deceased. Physics: 1962.
 Carl William Boothroyd, deceased. Biology—Plant Science: 1962.
 Robert Branner, deceased. Architecture: 1962.
 David Braybrooke, Centennial Commission Professor in the Liberal Arts, University of Texas at Austin: 1962.
 Sheldon Jack Brown, Professor of Physics, California State University, Fresno: 1962.
 Frank H. Brownell, Professor Emeritus of Mathematics, University of Washington: 1962.
 John Burton, deceased. Fine Arts: 1962.
 Eugenio Calabi, Thomas A. Scott Professor Emeritus of Mathematics, University of Pennsylvania: 1962.
 Ugo Camerini, Professor of Physics, University of Wisconsin–Madison: 1962.
 Richard H. Capps, deceased. Physics: 1962.
 Donald Selwyn Carne-Ross, University Professor and Professor of Classics and Modern Languages, Boston University: 1962.
 Gerard Ernest Caspary, Associate Professor of History, University of California, Berkeley: 1962.
 Chen Kang Chai, Senior Staff Scientist, Jackson Laboratory, Bar Harbor, Maine: 1962.
 Andrew F. Charwat, Emeritus Professor of Engineering and Applied Science, University of California, Los Angeles: 1962.
 Robert Lee Chasson, deceased. Professor Emeritus of Physics and Astronomy, University of Denver: 1962.
 George Whipple Clark, Breene M. Kerr Professor Emeritus of Physics, Massachusetts Institute of Technology: 1962.
 Nicholas E. Collias, Professor Emeritus of Zoology, University of California, Los Angeles: 1962.
 George R. Collins, deceased. Architecture: 1962.
 Evan Shelby Connell, writer, Santa Fe, New Mexico: 1962.
 Joseph Hurd Connell, Professor of Zoology, University of California, Santa Barbara: 1962, 1971.
 William Stewart Cornyn, deceased. Linguistics: 1962.
 Charles DuBois Coryell, deceased. Chemistry: 1962.
 Harmon Craig, Professor of Geochemistry and Oceanography, University of California, San Diego: 1962.
 Robert Payson Creed, Emeritus Professor of English and Comparative Literature, University of Massachusetts Amherst: 1962.
 Lois Crisler, deceased. Biology: 1962.
 James O. Crosby, Emeritus Professor of Spanish, Florida International University: 1962.
 William Ryan Dawson, director, Museum of Zoology, D.E.S. Brown Collegiate Professor Emeritus of Biological Sciences, University of Michigan: 1962.
 Frank W. Dickson, Research Professor of Geochemistry, University of Nevada, Reno: 1962.
 Tom F. Driver, Paul Tillich Professor Emeritus of Theology and Culture, Union Theological Seminary: 1962.
 John C. Eaton, composer; Professor of Music, University of Chicago: 1962, 1965.
 Murray Jacob Edelman, deceased. Political Science: 1962, 1983.
 Frank Norman Edmonds, Jr., deceased Professor of Astronomy, University of Texas at Austin: 1962.
 Stefán Einarsson, deceased. Germanics: 1962.
 Robert C. Elliott, deceased. 20th Century English Literature: 1962, 1971.
 Gerald Estrin, Emeritus Professor of Computer Science, University of California, Los Angeles: 1962, 1967.
 Gordon Feldman, Professor of Physics, Johns Hopkins University: 1962.
 Stephen Alexander Fischer-Galati, S. Harrison Thompson Distinguished Professor Emeritus of History, University of Colorado: 1962.
 Edwin A. Fleishman, Distinguished University Professor of Psychology; Director, Center for Behavioral and Cognitive Studies: 1962.
 Thomas R. Ford, Professor Emeritus of Sociology, University of Kentucky: 1962.
 Walter Freiberger, Professor of Applied Mathematics, Brown University: 1962.
 Michael Wulf Friedlander, Professor of Physics, Washington University: 1962.
 Kurt Otto Friedrichs, deceased. Mathematics: 1962.
 William Sefton Fyfe, Dean of Science; Emeritus Professor of Geology, University of Western Ontario: 1962, 1983.
 David Gale, Professor of Mathematics and Operations Research, University of California, Berkeley: 1962, 1981.
 J. Louis Giddings, deceased. Anthropology: 1962.
 Richard Franko Goldman, deceased. Music General: 1962.
 Bernard Goodman, Professor of Physics, University of Cincinnati: 1962.
 Elliot R. Goodman, Professor Emeritus of Political Science, Brown University: 1962.
 Edmund Irwin Gordon, deceased. Near Eastern Studies: 1962.
 John S. Gray, deceased. Medicine: 1962.
 Richard Hamilton Green, deceased. Medieval Literature: 1962.
 Martin Greenberg, Writer; Professor Emeritus of English, C. W. Post Center, Long Island University: 1962.
 Gerald Gunther, William Nelson Cromwell Emeritus Professor of Law, Stanford University: 1962.
 Everett Einar Hagen, deceased. Sociology: 1962
 George Haley, Emeritus Professor of Spanish, University of Chicago: 1962.
 Isaac Halpern, Emeritus Professor of Physics, University of Washington: 1962.
 John Ernest Moffatt Hancock, deceased. Law; 1962.
 Phillip Harth, Merritt Y. Hughes Professor of English, University of Wisconsin–Madison: 1962.
 John C. Hawkes, deceased. Fiction: 1962.
 Harrison Mosher Hayford, Professor Emeritus of English, Northwestern University: 1962.
 Lawrence Joseph Heidt, deceased. Chemistry: 1962.
 A. Carl Helmholz, Professor Emeritus of Physics, University of California, Berkeley: 1962.
 Simeon Kahn Heninger, Jr., University Distinguished Professor Emeritus of English, University of North Carolina at Chapel Hill: 1962.
 George Paul Hess, Professor of Biochemistry, Cornell University: 1962.
 Calvin John Heusser, Professor of Biology, New York University: 1962.
 Barnard Hewitt, Professor of Theatre and of Speech, University of Illinois at Urbana-Champaign: 1962.
 Philip Graham Hill, Professor of Mechanical Engineering, University of British Columbia: 1962.
 Joseph Hirsh, deceased. Sociology: 1962.
 Herbert I. Hochberg, Professor of Philosophy, University of Texas at Austin: 1962.
 James Holderbaum, Professor Emeritus of Art, Smith College: 1962.
 William Wolfgang Holdheim, Professor of Comparative Literature, Cornell University: 1962.
 Park Honan, Professor of English, University of Leeds: 1962, 1975.
 Hildegarde Howard, deceased. Earth Science: 1962. Married name: Wylde.
 Cyrus Henry Hoy, John B. Trevor Professor Emeritus of English, University of Rochester: 1962.
 Immanuel C. Y. Hsu, Emeritus Professor of History, University of California, Santa Barbara: 1962.
 Carl Barton Huffaker, deceased. Biology & Ecology: 1962.
 John Huggler, deceased. Music Composition: 1962, 1969.
 Richard Howard Hunt, Sculptor, Chicago: 1962.
 Lucille S. Hurley, deceased. Biochemistry-Molecular Biology: 1962, 1969.
 Fritz John, deceased. Applied Mathematics: 1962, 1969.
 Noah R. Johnson, Jr., Senior Scientist, Oak Ridge National Laboratory: 1962.
 Bruce Foster Johnston, Professor of Economics, Food Research Institute, Stanford University: 1962.
 Philip Kelley, scholar, Winfield, Kansas: 1962, 1970.
 Paul J Kellogg, Professor Emeritus of Physics, University of Minnesota: 1962.
 Jack Carl Kiefer, deceased. Statistics: 1962.
 James Edward King, deceased. French History: 1962.
 Galway Kinnell, poet; Samuel F. B. Morse Professor in the Arts & Sciences, New York University: 1962, 1974.
 Simon Bernard Kochen, Professor of Mathematics, Princeton University: 1962.
 Ralph David Kodis, Branch Chief, Department of Transportation, Transportation Systems Center, Cambridge, Massachusetts: 1962.
 Kenneth David Kopple, director, Cheminformatics, SmithKline Beecham Pharmaceuticals, Philadelphia: 1962.
 Victor George Kord, painter; Professor of Painting and Printmaking, Virginia Commonwealth University: 1962.
 Jan Korringa, retired Senior Research Associate, Chevron Oil Field Research Company, La Habra, California: 1962.
 Alvin Isaac Krasna, Professor of Biochemistry & Molecular Biophysics, Columbia University: 1962.
 William L. Kraushaar, Max Mason Professor Emeritus of Physics, University of Wisconsin–Madison: 1962, 1973.
 Alex Dony Krieger, Professor Emeritus of Anthropology, University of Washington: 1962.
 Harvey Leibenstein, deceased. Economics: 1962.
 Edgar Rothwell Lemon, Professor Emeritus of Environmental Physics, Cornell University: 1962.
 Cornelius Thomas Leondes, Boeing Professor Emeritus of Electrical Engineering, University of California, Los Angeles: 1962.
 Wolfgang Arthur Leppmann, Professor Emeritus of German, University of Oregon: 1962, 1971.
 Joseph Richmond Levenson, deceased. Far Eastern Studies: 1962.
 Denise Levertov, deceased. Poetry: 1962.
 Bruno Lucchesi, sculptor; Instructor, New School for Social Research: 1962.
 John Fairbanks Lynen, retired Professor of English, University College, University of Toronto: 1962.
 Carol Cook MacClintock, deceased. Music Research: 1962.
 Forrest McDonald, Distinguished Research Professor of History, University of Alabama: 1962.
 John Herbert McDowell, deceased. Music Composition: 1962.
 George Cunliffe McVittie, deceased. Astronomy: 1962, 1970.
 Henry William Menard, Jr., deceased. Earth Science: 1962.
 Robert K. Merton, Foundation Scholar, Russell Sage Foundation; University Professor Emeritus and Special Service Professor, Columbia University: 1962.
 Hans Meyerhoff, deceased. Philosophy: 1962.
 Francis Edward Mineka, deceased. 19th Century English Literature: 1962.
 Ellen Moers, deceased. American Literature: 1962.
 Robert Walter Moevs, deceased. Composer; Professor Emeritus of Music, Rutgers College, Rutgers University: 1962.
 Robert Wharton Morris, deceased. Biology & Ecology: 1962.
 Forrest S. Mozer, Professor of Physics, University of California, Berkeley: 1962.
 Charles Muscatine, Professor Emeritus of English, University of California, Berkeley: 1962.
 Marc Nerlove, Professor of Agricultural & Resource Economics, University of Maryland at College Park: 1962, 1978.
 Blake Reynolds Nevius, deceased. American Literature: 1962
 James Gordon Ogden, III, Professor of Biology and Director, Radiocarbon Dating Laboratory, Dalhousie University: 1962.
 Schubert Miles Ogden, Professor of Theology, Southern Methodist University: 1962.
 Jerry S. Olson, Plant Ecology Group Leader, Oak Ridge National Laboratory; Professor of Botany, University of Tennessee: 1962.
 Paul A. Olson, Kate Foster Professor of English, University of Nebraska-Lincoln: 1962.
 Américo Paredes, Raymond Dickson, Alton C. Allen, and Dillon Anderson Centennial Professor Emeritus of English and of Anthropology, University of Texas at Austin: 1962.
 William Riley Parker, deceased. 16th & 17th Century English Literature: 1962.
 Stanley George Payne, Hilldale-Jaume Vicens Vives Professor of History, University of Wisconsin–Madison: 1962.
 Bradford Perkins, Emeritus Professor of History, University of Michigan: 1962.
 Merrill D. Peterson, Thomas Jefferson Memorial Foundation Professor Emeritus of History, University of Virginia: 1962.
 James Charles Phillips, Distinguished Member of Technical Staff, Theoretical Physics Research Department, Bell Telephone Laboratories, Murray Hill, New Jersey: 1962.
 David Pines, Professor of Physics and of Electrical Engineering, University of Illinois at Urbana-Champaign: 1962, 1969.
 Donald Pizer, Pierce Butler Professor of English, Tulane University: 1962.
 Philip P. Poirier, deceased. British History: 1962.
 Hugh Franklin Rankin, deceased. U.S. History: 1962.
 Leonard Gilbert Ratner, Professor Emeritus of Music, Stanford University: 1962.
 Bertram H. Raven, Professor of Psychology, University of California, Los Angeles: 1962.
 Lionel Israel Rebhun, Professor of Biology, University of Virginia: 1962.
 Irving Reiner, deceased Professor of Mathematics, University of Illinois at Urbana-Champaign: 1962.
 Eric Reissner, deceased. Applied Mechanics: 1962.
 William Henry Rey, Professor Emeritus of Germanic Languages and Literature and Comparative Literature, University of Washington: 1962.
 Fred L. Ribe, Professor Emeritus of Nuclear Engineering, University of Washington: 1962.
 Norman Robert Rich, Professor of History, Brown University: 1962.
 M. Dean Richardson, Artist; Professor of Painting, Rhode Island School of Design: 1962.
 Ellis Rivkin, Adolph S. Ochs Professor of Jewish History, Hebrew Union College-Jewish Institute of Religion, Cincinnati: 1962.
 Henry Lithgow Roberts, deceased. Russian Studies: 1962.
 Seymour Rosofsky, deceased. Fine Arts: 1962, 1963.
 Gunther Erich Rothenberg, Emeritus Professor of History, Purdue University; Research Associate, Monash University, Australia: 1962.
 William J. Rutter, Hertzstein Professor of Biochemistry and Biophysics, School of Medicine, University of California, San Francisco: 1962.
 Georges Sabagh, Professor of Sociology and Director, Center for Near Eastern Studies, University of California, Los Angeles: 1962.
 Gerard Salton, deceased. Computer Science: 1962.
 Whitney Lee Savage, painter, North Tarrytown, New York: 1962.
 Donald Turner Sawyer, Jr., Distinguished Professor Emeritus of Chemistry, Texas A&M University: 1962.
 Gunther A. Schuller, composer, conductor, writer, Newton Center, Massachusetts: 1962, 1963.
 Merton M. Sealts, Jr., deceased. American Literature: 1962.
 Russell Perry Sebold, Edwin B. and Lenore R. Williams Professor Emeritus of Romance Languages, University of Pennsylvania: 1962.
 Oskar Seidlin, deceased. German: 1962, 1976.
 Francis Reynolds Shanley, deceased. Engineering: 1962.
 Maurice Mandel Shapiro, Chief Scientist Emeritus, Lab for Cosmic Ray Physics, Washington, DC: 1962.
 Geraldine Sharpe, deceased. Photography: 1962.
 John R. Silber, President, Boston University; University Professor and Professor of Philosophy and Law: 1962.
 Louis Simpson, poet; Distinguished Professor Emeritus of English, State University of New York at Stony Brook: 1962, 1970.
 Ezra Sims, Composer; Instructor in Music Theory, New England Conservatory of Music: 1962.
 Marcus George Singer, Professor of Philosophy, University of Wisconsin–Madison: 1962.
 Sidney Solomon, deceased. Biochemistry-Molecular Biology: 1962.
 Blake Lee Spahr, Emeritus Professor of German and Comparative Literature, University of California, Berkeley: 1962.
 Frank O. Spinney, Professor Emeritus of History Museum Training and American Folk Culture, Cooperstown Graduate Program, SUNY-Oneonta: 1962.
 William Harris Stahl, deceased. History of Science: 1962.
 Robert Greenblatt Stanley, deceased. Biochemistry: 1962.
 Miriam Kosh Starkman, Professor of English, Queens College, City University of New York: 1962.
 Eric Stein, Hessel E. Yntema Professor Emeritus of Law, University of Michigan: 1962.
 Ann C. Steinbrocker, deceased. Fine Arts: 1962.
 Kenneth Noble Stevens, C. J. LeBel Professor of Electrical Engineering, Massachusetts Institute of Technology: 1962.
 Robert M. Stevenson, Professor Emeritus of Music, University of California, Los Angeles: 1962.
 R. Martin Stiles, Professor of Chemistry, University of Kentucky: 1962.
 Walter Adolf Strauss, Emeritus Treuhaft Professor of the Humanities, Case Western Reserve University: 1962.
 James Stephen Strombotne, artist; Professor of Art, University of California, Riverside: 1962.
 Robert Henry Super, deceased. 19th Century English Literature: 1962, 1970.
 Michio Suzuki, Center for Advanced Study Professor of Mathematics, University of Illinois at Urbana-Champaign: 1962.
 Alexander William Szogyi, Emeritus Professor of Romance Languages, Hunter College, City University of New York: 1962.
 Elizabeth Marshall Thomas, writer, Peterborough, New Hampshire: 1962.
 Homer Leonard Thomas, Professor Emeritus of Art History and Archaeology, University of Missouri-Columbia: 1962.
 Thomas L. Thorson, retired Professor of Political Science, Indiana University at South Bend: 1962.
 Laszlo Tisza, Professor Emeritus of Physics and Senior Lecturer, Massachusetts Institute of Technology: 1962.
 James Leslie Tuck, deceased. Biochemistry: 1962.
 Karl K. Turekian, Benjamin Silliman Professor of Geology and Geophysics, Yale University: 1962.
 Ansei Uchima, Emeritus Faculty of Sarah Lawrence College: 1962, 1970.
 Barry Ulanov, Millicent Carey McIntosh Professor Emeritus of English, Barnard College, Columbia University: 1962.
 Jean G. Van Bladel, Emeritus Professor of Electrical Engineering and Director, Laboratory for Electromagnetism and Acoustics, State University of Ghent: 1962.
 Richard Steven Varga, University Professor of Mathematics and Computer Sciences, Kent State University: 1962.
 Aram Vartanian, deceased: French Literature: 1962.
 Theodore Vermeulen, deceased. Chemistry: 1962.
 John Nathaniel Vincent, Jr., deceased. Music Composition: 1962.
 Theodore H. Von Laue, deceased. Russian History: 1962, 1974.
 Edward Lewis Wallant, deceased. Fiction: 1962.
 Henry Christopher Wallich, deceased. Economics: 1962.
 Talbot H. Waterman, Professor Emeritus of Biology, Yale University: 1962.
 Floyd C. Watkins, Charles Howard Candler Professor Emeritus of American Literature; Emory University: 1962.
 Lee Wolff Wattenberg, Professor of Pathology, University of Minnesota Medical School: 1962.
 John Stewart Waugh, Institute Professor of Chemistry, Massachusetts Institute of Technology: 1962.
 Paul Noden West, Professor of English and Comparative Literature, Pennsylvania State University: 1962.
 Frank Henry Westheimer, Morris Loeb Professor Emeritus of Chemistry, Harvard University: 1962.
 Frederick Bernays Wiener, deceased. Law: 1962.
 Hiram D. Williams, painter; Distinguished Professor Emeritus of Art, University of Florida: 1962.
 Thomas Alonzo Williams, Jr., deceased. Fiction: 1962
 William Abell Wimsatt, deceased. Biology: 1962.
 James Wines, Chairman, Department of Environmental Design, Parson School of Design; President, SITE, Inc.: 1962.
 Clara Brussel Winston, deceased. Fiction: 1962.
 Richard L. Wolfgang, deceased. Chemistry: 1962, 1971.
 Stefan Wolpe, deceased. Music Composition: 1962, 1970.
 Robert Smith Woodbury, deceased, History of Science: 1962.
 Arthur E. Woodward, Professor of Chemistry and Biochemistry, City College, City University of New York: 1962.
 Chen Ning Yang, Albert Einstein Professor of Physics, State University of New York at Stony Brook: 1962.
 Richard Yates, deceased. Fiction: 1962, 1980.
 Robert Paul Ziff, deceased William R. Kenan, Jr. Professor Emeritus of Philosophy, University of North Carolina at Chapel Hill: 1962.
 Moses Zucker, deceased. Near Eastern Studies: 1962.

1962 Latin American and Caribbean Fellows

 Carlos Alberto Altavista, retired Doctor in Astronomy, Department of Celestial Mechanics, Astronomical Observatory, National University of La Plata: 1962.
 José Rafael Arboleda, S.J., Professor of Anthropology, Xavier Pontifical University, Bogotá: 1962.
 Maria Buchinger, conservationist; University Professor of Natural Resources, University of the Saviour, Buenos Aires: 1962.
 Luiz de Aguiar Costa Pinto, sociologist: 1962.
 Elías Ramón de la Sota, Professor of Morphology, Faculty of Natural Sciences and Museum, National University of La Plata: 1962, 1974.
 Mercedes Delfinado, scientist, Beneficial Insects Laboratory, Beltsville, Maryland: 1962.
 Oswaldo Grillo Rodríguez, Research Associate and Coordinator, Center of Antitoxic Serum, School of Pharmacy, Central University of Venezuela: 1962.
 Enrique Grünbaum Daniel, Professor of Materials Engineering, Tel-Aviv University: 1962, 1963.
 Gabriela Hässel de Menéndez, Jefe Division Criptogamia, Argentine Museum of Natural Sciences, Buenos Aires: 1962.
 Osvaldo Costa de Lacerda, composer; Member of the Academia Brasileira de Musica, São Paulo: 1962
 Armando Federico Leanza, deceased. Biology: 1962.
 Enrique López Mendoza, physiologist, National Institute of Orthopedics, Mexico, D.F.: 1962, 1963, 1964.
 Carlos Alberto Menéndez, deceased. Earth Science: 1962.
 Claudio B. Naranjo Cohen, Chilean-born psychiatrist: 1962.
 Victor Nussenzweig, Herman M. Biggs Professor of Pathology, New York University School of Medicine: 1962, 1964.
 José Oliver-González, Adjunct Professor of Medical Zoology, School of Medicine, and Senior Scientist, Puerto Rico Nuclear Center, University of Puerto Rico: 1962.
 Antonio Pagés Larraya, director, Institute of Argentine Literature, University of Buenos Aires: 1962.
 Rosendo Pascual, Professor Emeritus of Vertebrate Paleontology, National University of La Plata: 1962.
 Shridath Surendranath Ramphal, Commonwealth Secretary-General, London: 1962.
 Mario H. Ricardi Salinas, director, Herbarium, Faculty of Forestry Sciences, University of the Andes, Mérida: 1962.
 Alberto Mario E Salas, Retired Professor of History, University of Buenos Aires: 1962, 1971.
 José Squadroni, S.J., Retired President, Universidad Catolica, Montevideo: 1962.
 Jesús Torres Gallardo, biochemist: 1962.
 Vicente Guilherme Toscano, Professor of Organic Chemistry, Institute of Chemistry, University of São Paulo: 1962.
 Marino Villavicencio Núñez, Professor Emeritus of Biochemistry and Head, Department of Biochemistry and Physiology, National University of San Marcos: 1962, 1963.
 María Luisa Wilkinson, Lecturer, Department of Biochemistry, Molecular and Cell Biology, Cornell University: 1962. Appointed as Dinamarca (Gallardo), María Luisa.
 Maria Concepcion Zardoya, Professor Emeritus of Spanish, University of Massachusetts Boston: 1962.

See also
Guggenheim Fellowship

References

External links
Guggenheim Fellows for 1962

1962
1962 awards